Boy Meets Girl is the first studio album from San Francisco, California, United States, alternative rock band Stroke 9. It was released in 1993.

Track listing
 "Today"
 "Carey-Anne"
 "Wild"
 "Yer Voice"
 "Manny's Song"
 "Go Away"
 "Directions"
 "Lapel"
 "Marin"

Stroke 9 albums
1993 debut albums